The Swedish Tourist Association (abbreviated STF), founded in 1885, aims at promoting outdoor life and knowledge among the Swedes about their country.

The Association maintains a variety of trails, huts and hostels in different parts of Sweden. It became known for the creation of Kungsleden, a 440 kilometer long hiking trail in Lapland, through one of Europe's largest remaining wilderness areas.

The association has approximately 300,000 members, employing about 500 people of which 400 for seasonal work, for instance as landlords for 45 fell huts and 10 larger fell hostels.

Dag Hammarskjöld belongs to the association's most prominent leaders. As Secretary-General of the United Nations the only remaining duties Hammarskjöld kept in Sweden were those associated with his vice-chairmanship of Svenska Turistföreningen and his membership of the Swedish Academy. The farm Backåkra, acquired by Hammarskjöld in 1957, is in accordance to his will maintained by STF. A part of the farm serves as a retreat for the members of the Academy.

References

External links
 Svenska Turistföreningen, official web site

Hiking organizations
Swedish culture
1885 establishments in Sweden
Tourism in Sweden
Organizations established in 1885
Tourism agencies
Non-profit organizations based in Sweden